Pascal Papé (born 5 October 1980) is a former French rugby union footballer.

Papé played as a lock, and currently most recently represented Stade Français in club rugby, after spending many years at Bourgoin. He also spent one season at Castres Olympique. He earned his first test cap for France against Ireland in the 2004 Six Nations Championship, scoring a try in the 35–17 victory.

Papé was overlooked for the 2007 Rugby World Cup, and under new coach Marc Lièvremont he struggled to hold down a regular place in the starting line-up. He was a member of the squad that won the Grand Slam during the 2010 Six Nations Championship, but made just one appearance during the 2011 Six Nations Championship, and that was off the bench against Wales. However, he was selected as part of the provisional squad for the 2011 Rugby World Cup. Papé's subsequent form saw him elevated into the starting line-up for the games against England, Wales and New Zealand, in which he performed admirably. He was in the starting XV in the 2011 Rugby World Cup Final, which saw the All Blacks win narrowly 8–7.

From 2012, he was elevated to Vice Captain behind Thierry Dusautoir, by newly appointed head coach Philippe Saint-André. He was named Captain for the 2012 France rugby union tour of Argentina and the 2012 end-of-year rugby union internationals. The end of year rugby tests were a great point in French rugby, haven beaten Australia 33–6, Argentina 39–22 and Samoa 22–14. Subsequently, Papé was retained as captain for the 2013 Six Nations Championship, but later replaced by Thierry Dusautoir following injury. France finished 6th that Championship.

References

External links
France profile at FFR
Profile at ESPN Scrum

1980 births
Living people
Sportspeople from Lyon
French rugby union players
France international rugby union players
Rugby union locks